Valley Falls is a village and census-designated place (CDP) in the town of Cumberland, Providence County, Rhode Island, United States. The population was 12,094 at the 2020 census.

Warren Buffett's company Berkshire Hathaway was founded in 1839 by Oliver Chace in Valley Falls as a cotton-manufacturing company, called the Valley Falls Company. Valley Falls is also the home of the Ann & Hope Mill.

Geography
It is bordered by the city of Central Falls, Rhode Island to the south, the city of Attleboro, Massachusetts to the east, and the town of Lincoln, Rhode Island to the west. The Blackstone River runs along the western and southern edge of the community.

According to the United States Census Bureau, the CDP has a total area of 9.5 km2 (3.7 mi2). 9.2 km2 (3.5 mi2) of it is land and 0.3 km2 (0.1 mi2) of it (3.01%) is water.

Demographics

As of the census of 2000, there were 11,599 people, 4,494 households, and 3,258 families residing in the CDP. The population density was 1,261.5/km2 (3,269.5/mi2). There were 4,668 housing units at an average density of 507.7/km2 (1,315.8/mi2). The racial makeup of the CDP was 95.88% White, 0.83% African American, 0.11% Native American, 0.52% Asian, 1.42% from other races, and 1.24% from two or more races. Hispanic or Latino of any race were 3.94% of the population. Valley Falls has an extremely large Irish population.

There were 4,494 households, out of which 32.2% had children under the age of 18 living with them, 57.3% were married couples living together, 11.4% had a female householder with no husband present, and 27.5% were non-families. 23.5% of all households were made up of individuals, and 11.5% had someone living alone who was 65 years of age or older. The average household size was 2.57 and the average family size was 3.05.

In the CDP, the population was spread out, with 23.3% under the age of 18, 7.1% from 18 to 24, 30.4% from 25 to 44, 22.8% from 45 to 64, and 16.6% who were 65 years of age or older. The median age was 39 years. For every 100 females, there were 90.3 males. For every 100 females age 18 and over, there were 88.0 males.

The median income for a household in the CDP was $46,163, and the median income for a family was $52,414. Males had a median income of $35,334 versus $25,422 for females. The per capita income for the CDP was $20,373. About 3.8% of families and 5.0% of the population were below the poverty line, including 4.7% of those under age 18 and 10.6% of those age 65 or over.

References

External links

 Providence Journal video of the Blackstone River
 History of Valley Falls

Census-designated places in Providence County, Rhode Island
Villages in Providence County, Rhode Island
Cumberland, Rhode Island
Portuguese-American culture in Rhode Island
Providence metropolitan area
Villages in Rhode Island
Census-designated places in Rhode Island